Sir Thomas Davall (1644-1712), of Dovercourt, Essex, was an English Member of Parliament.

He was a Member (MP) of the Parliament of England for Harwich 1695–1706.

References

English knights
17th-century English people
People from Essex
Members of the Parliament of England (pre-1707)
1644 births
1712 deaths